Paulo de Sene (born 22 May 1948) is a Brazilian weightlifter. He competed at the 1976 Summer Olympics and the 1980 Summer Olympics.

References

External links
 

1948 births
Living people
Brazilian male weightlifters
Olympic weightlifters of Brazil
Weightlifters at the 1976 Summer Olympics
Weightlifters at the 1980 Summer Olympics
People from Jundiaí
Pan American Games medalists in weightlifting
Pan American Games silver medalists for Brazil
Weightlifters at the 1975 Pan American Games
Sportspeople from São Paulo (state)
20th-century Brazilian people